Saleem Pervez (September 9, 1947, Lahore, Punjab – 24 April 2013) was a Pakistani cricketer who played one ODI in 1980.

References

External links

1947 births
2013 deaths
Pakistan One Day International cricketers
Pakistani cricketers
Pakistan Railways cricketers
National Bank of Pakistan cricketers
Cricketers from Lahore